The blue fantail has been split into two species:

 Mindanao blue fantail, Rhipidura superciliaris
 Visayan blue fantail, Rhipidura samarensis